The women's 100 metres hurdles event at the 1971 Pan American Games was held in Cali on 31 July and 1 August. It was the first time this distance was held at the Games replacing the 80 metres hurdles.

Medalists

Results

Heats
Wind:Heat 1: 0.0 m/s, Heat 2: +2.4 m/s

Final
Wind: +4.4 m/s

References

Athletics at the 1971 Pan American Games
1971